Schoenia is a genus of Australian plants in the tribe Gnaphalieae within the family Asteraceae.

Species list
The following is a list of Schoenia species accepted by the Australian Plant Census as at October 2022:

References

Endemic flora of Australia
Asteraceae genera
Gnaphalieae